Olympic Stadium station may refer to:

 Olympic Stadium station (Nanjing Metro), a station on the Nanjing Metro in Jiangsu, China
 Olympic Stadium station (Nanchang Metro), a station on Line 1 (Nanchang Metro) in Jiangxi, China

See also
 Olympic Sports Center station (disambiguation)
 Stadium station (disambiguation)